Too Young to Die: Singles 1990–1995 is a compilation album released by English band Saint Etienne in 1995. The compilation collects the group's singles spanning the period of 1990 to 1995, five of which had not appeared on a studio album or featured on their 1993 compilation You Need a Mess of Help to Stand Alone. The track "He's on the Phone" was released as a single just before the album's release. The album peaked at number 17 on the UK Albums Chart and was certified Silver by the BPI (60,000 copies sold).

The album received excellent reviews with critical opinion particularly favourable to the first half of the compilation. The album was released on standard CD, limited edition (10,000 copies) double-CD (with a bonus CD of remixes and an expanded booklet including extra photographs), Cassette, LP and VHS. Artwork was designed by Negativespace with photography by Angus Ashford, Aude Prieur, James Fry, Joe Dilworth, and Paul Kelly.

The initial bonus CD of remixes was re-released as disc-one of the non-limited Double-CD compilation Casino Classics in 1996.

Track listing

Personnel
The compilation liner notes do not list musician or production credits. The following are adapted from other releases.

 Sarah Cracknell – vocals (all tracks except "Only Love Can Break Your Heart" and "Kiss and Make Up")
 Bob Stanley – keyboards, tambourine
 Pete Wiggs – keyboards, sampler, bongos
 Ian Catt – guitars, keyboard programming
 Moira Lambert – vocals ("Only Love Can Break Your Heart")
 Harvey Williams – bass guitar ("Only Love Can Break Your Heart")
 Donna Savage – vocals ("Kiss and Make Up")
 Debsey – vocals ("Who Do You Think You Are"), backing vocals ("Pale Movie")
 Tim Burgess – vocals ("I Was Born on Christmas Day")
 Siobhan Brookes – backing vocals ("Hug My Soul", "Pale Movie")
 Ian Davies – flamenco guitar ("Pale Movie")
 Spencer Smith – drums ("Hug My Soul")
 Étienne Daho – vocals ("He's on the Phone")

Charts

See also

References

1995 greatest hits albums
Saint Etienne (band) compilation albums
Heavenly Recordings compilation albums